Partners is an American sitcom starring Kelsey Grammer and Martin Lawrence that aired on FX. The show centers on two Chicago lawyers from vastly different backgrounds who develop a partnership after they unexpectedly meet in court on the worst day of their lives. This was Lawrence's first TV series since his eponymous Fox series ended its five-season run in 1997.

FX ordered 10 episodes of the sitcom and, if the series had done well over its first 10-episode run, the network would have ordered an additional 90 episodes. The sitcom premiered on August 4, 2014, and was not renewed after its one season.

Cast 
 Kelsey Grammer as Allen Braddock: a hotshot lawyer fired from his own father's firm
 Martin Lawrence as Marcus Jackson: a community activist going through a divorce
 Rory O'Malley as Michael: Marcus's ambivalent gay assistant
 Edi Patterson as Veronica: investigator for Allen and Marcus's law firm
 Telma Hopkins as Ruth Jackson: Marcus's mother
 Danièle Watts as Laura Jackson: Marcus's daughter
 McKaley Miller as Lizzie Braddock: Allen's step-daughter

Production 
It was announced that the series would be filmed in Los Angeles. The original working titles were The Partnership and Braddock & Jackson.

Episodes

References

External links 
 

2010s American sitcoms
2014 American television series debuts
2014 American television series endings
2010s American legal television series
English-language television shows
FX Networks original programming
Television series by Lionsgate Television
Television shows filmed in Los Angeles
Television shows set in Chicago